The 1985 Girabola was the seventh season of top-tier football competition in Angola. Estrela Clube Primeiro de Maio were the defending champions.

The league comprised 14 teams, the bottom three of which were relegated.

Primeiro de Maio were crowned champions, winning their 2nd title, while Gaiatos de Benguela, Dínamos do Kwanza Sul and Leões do Planalto were relegated.

Osvaldo Saturnino aka Jesus of Petro de Luanda finished as the top scorer with 19 goals.

Changes from the 1984 season
Relegated: M.C.H. do Uíge, Nacional de Benguela, Progresso do Sambizanga
Promoted: Dínamos do Kwanza Sul (ex-Andorinhas), Gaiatos de Benguela, Leões do Planalto

League table

Results

Season statistics

Most goals scored in a single match

Top scorers

Champions

External links
Federação Angolana de Futebol

Angola
Angola
Girabola seasons